Helen Jean Anderson (October 12, 1929 – January 24, 2023) was an American cookbook author and editor.

Life and work
Anderson was born in Raleigh, North Carolina. Her father was a botany professor at North Carolina State University at Raleigh at the time of her birth, though he later moved to the University of North Carolina in Chapel Hill. Anderson had a BS in food and nutrition from Cornell University and a MS in journalism degree from Columbia University. She began her journalistic career at The Raleigh Times, after receiving her undergraduate degree, and started at Ladies' Home Journal as a graduate student.

Anderson helped organize the James Beard Journalism Awards and for two years, co-chaired that committee. Though best known for her articles in Bon Appétit, Food & Wine, Gourmet, More, Travel + Leisure and other magazines, Anderson served as assistant food editor, then managing editor of The Ladies’ Home Journal, as contributing editor at Family Circle and Diversion magazines, as chief consulting editor for Reader's Digest cookbooks, and as food columnist for New York Newsday and the Los Angeles Times Syndicate. She was a member of the James Beard Cookbook Hall of Fame and a charter member of Les Dames d’Escoffier and the New York Women’s Culinary Alliance. Anderson wrote around 30 books, with the last being published in 2019.

An authority on Portugal, its food, wine, and folk art, Anderson traveled around that country for 40 years. Her Food of Portugal was named "Best Foreign Cookbook" in the 1986 Tastemaker Awards. Anderson's food, travel, and general features won various awards, among them, the Pulitzer Traveling Scholarship, the George Hedman Travel Writing Award, and two commendations from the Portuguese government.

Personal life and death
Anderson moved back to Chapel Hill in 2007, after spending much of her adult life in New York City. She died at her home on January 24, 2023, at the age of 93.

Bibliography 
The Art of American Indian Cooking (with Yeffe Kimball). Simon & Schuster: 1965.
The Doubleday Cookbook (with Elaine Hanna). Doubleday: 1975.  R.T. French Tastemaker Cookbook-of- the-Year as well as Best Basic Cookbook
Jean Anderson's Processor Cooking. William Morrow and Company, Inc.:  1979
Half a Can of Tomato Paste & Other Culinary Dilemmas (with Ruth Buchan). Harper & Row, 1980.  Seagram/International Association of Culinary Professionals Award, Best Specialty Cookbook of the Year.
Jean Anderson Cooks: Her Kitchen Reference & Recipe Collection.  William Morrow and Company, Inc.:  1982
Jean Anderson's New Processor Cooking. William Morrow and Company, Inc.:  1983
The New Doubleday Cookbook (with Elaine Hanna). Doubleday: 1985. 	
The Food of Portugal. William Morrow: 1986.  Seagram/International Association of Culinary Professionals Award, Best Foreign Cookbook of the Year
The New German Cookbook (with Hedy Würz). HarperCollins: 1993
The American Century Cookbook.  Clarkson Potter: 1997
The Good Morning America Cut the Calories Cookbook (co-edited with Sara Moulton).  Hyperion: 2000
Dinners in a Dish or a Dash. William Morrow: 2000
Process This! New Recipes for the New Generation of Food Processors. William Morrow: 2003. James Beard Best Cookbook, Tools & Techniques Category
Quick Loaves.  William Morrow: 2005
A Love Affair with Southern Cooking: Recipes and Recollections.  Foreword by Sara Moulton. William Morrow: 2007
Falling Off the Bone.  John Wiley & Sons:  2010
Kiln to Kitchen: Recipes from Beloved North Carolina Potters. University of North Carolina Press: 2019.

Notes

External links
 Jean Anderson's official website

1929 births
2023 deaths
20th-century American women writers
21st-century American women writers
American cookbook writers
American magazine editors
American travel writers
American women travel writers
Columbia University Graduate School of Journalism alumni
Cornell University College of Agriculture and Life Sciences alumni
James Beard Foundation Award winners
People from Chapel Hill, North Carolina
Portuguese art
Portuguese cuisine
Pulitzer Traveling Scholarship winners
Women cookbook writers
Women magazine editors